Mordellistena luteicornis is a beetle in the genus Mordellistena of the family Mordellidae. It was described in 1952 by Karl Friedrich Ermisch.

References

luteicornis
Beetles described in 1952